Børge Andersen may refer to:

 Børge Kaas Andersen (1937–2019), Danish rower
 Børge Andersen (chess player) (1934–1993), Danish chess player